Rhuan is a name. Notable people with the name include:

Given name
 Rhuan (footballer, born 1991), full name Rhuan Rogerio Elias Barbosa, Brazilian football centre-back
 Rhuan (footballer, born 2000), full name Rhuan da Silveira Castro, Brazilian football attacking midfielder

See also
 Ruan (disambiguation)